Satsuma is a genus of air-breathing land snails, terrestrial pulmonate gastropod mollusks in the tribe Aegistini  of the subfamily Bradybaeninae  in the family Camaenidae.

Species
Species within the genus Satsuma include:
 Satsuma adiriensis C.-C. Hwang & S.-P. Wu, 2018
 Satsuma akiratadai Kameda & Fukuda, 2015
 Satsuma albida (H. Adams, 1870)
 Satsuma auratibasis Wu, Hwang & Lin, 2008
 Satsuma bacca (L. Pfeiffer, 1866)
 Satsuma bairdi (H. Adams, 1866)
 Satsuma careocaecum Wu, Hwang & Lin, 2008
 Satsuma eucosmia (Pilsbry, 1895)
 Satsuma ferruginea (Pilsbry, 1900)
 Satsuma formosensis (L. Pfeiffer, 1866)
 Satsuma hagiomontis Wu, Hwang & Lin, 2008
 Satsuma huberi Wu, Hwang & Lin, 2008
 Satsuma inkhavilayi Páll-Gergely, 2019
 Satsuma insignis (Pilsbry & Hirase, 1906)
 Satsuma japonica
 Satsuma jinlunensis C.-C. Hwang, Okubo & Tada, 2017
 Satsuma kanoi Wu, Hwang & Lin, 2008
 Satsuma katipolensis Wu, Hwang & Lin, 2008
 Satsuma largillierti (Pfeiffer, 1849)
 Satsuma lini Wu, Hwang & Lin, 2008
 Satsuma luteolella Wu, Hwang & Lin, 2008
 Satsuma mellea (L. Pfeiffer, 1866)
 Satsuma meridionalis (Möllendorff, 1884)
 Satsuma mii S.-P. Wu & C.-C. Wu, 2017
 Satsuma mimiwui S.-P. Wu & C.-C. Wu, 2017 
 Satsuma mollicula (Pilsbry & Hirase, 1909)
 Satsuma myomphala
 Satsuma omphaloides
 Satsuma paradoxa S.-P. Wu & Tsai, 2016
 Satsuma pekanensis (Rolle, 1911)
 Satsuma phoenicis Wu, Hwang & Lin, 2008
 Satsuma pilsbryi Wu, Hwang & Lin, 2008
 Satsuma polymorpha Wu, Hwang & Lin, 2008
 Satsuma rubrolaeva C.-C. Hwang & Chang, 2008
 Satsuma rugosa Kuroda & Minato, 1981
 Satsuma sadamii Kuroda & Minato, 1975
 Satsuma sororcula (Pilsbry, 1902)
 Satsuma sphaeroconus (L. Pfeiffer, 1866)
 Satsuma squamigera C.-C. Hwang & S.-P. Wu, 2018
 Satsuma succincta (H. Adams, 1866)
 Satsuma swinhoei Wu, Hwang & Lin, 2008
 Satsuma tanegashimae (Pilsbry, 1901)
 Satsuma thachi F. Huber, 2018
 Satsuma uncopila (Heude, 1882)
 Satsuma vallis Wu, Hwang & Lin, 2008
 Satsuma viridibasis Wu, Hwang & Lin, 2008
 Satsuma wenshini S.-P. Wu & C-L. Tsai, 2014

References

 Bank, R. (2017). Classification of the Recent terrestrial Gastropoda of the World. Last update: July 16th, 2017

External links
 Adams A. (1868). On the species of Helicidae found in Japan. Annals and Magazine of Natural History. ser. 4, 1: 459-472

Camaenidae